Veliki Jelnik is a small settlement above Blagovica in the Municipality of Lukovica in central Slovenia.

References

External links
 
Veliki Jelnik on Geopedia

Populated places in the Municipality of Lukovica